Joseph von Dedovich (1752 – 4 December 1827) was an Austrian lieutenant field marshal of Serbian origin. Joseph and Martin von Dedovich are brothers.

Biography
Dedovich took part in the Siege of Bosanski Novi in 1788 before earning the command of a brigade in Vukassovich's division in northwestern Italy campaign in early 1800. Dedovich went on to command an infantry brigade in St. Julien's division in 1805 and then he commanded a division in Hiller's Tyrol Column at the Battle of Verona on 18 October 1805. After his promotion to Feldmarschalleutnant on 1 September 1807 he was put in command of a division, which function he held during the entire campaign of 1809. Dedovich commanded that infantry division at the victorious Battle of Caldiero. On 2 May 1809, he commanded an independent infantry division at Ebelsberg. During the Battle of Aspern-Essling on 21–22 May 1809, he commanded a division in IV Corps; then a division in Bellegarde's First Corps at Wagram (4–5 July 1809); and finally at Zaim where the armistice took place. Afterward, he held various posts and offices. In 1819 he was named vice-president of the Military Appellate Court.

He died on 4 December 1827 in Vienna.

Dedovich had a younger brother Martin von Dedovich (1756–1822), who followed in his footsteps.

Promotions
 Major: October 1790
 Lieutenant colonel: 15 May 1791
 Colonel: May 1795
 Generalmajor: 2 October 1799 (w.r.f. 30 November 1799)
 Feldmarschalleutnant: 1 September 1807
 Posts and Offices (Army, Politics, Court)
 Vice-President of the Military Appellate Court: 1819

Elevation of Social Status
 Freiherr is equivalent to "Baron" in social circumstances, although not the official title.: 17 October 1811

References 

1752 births
1827 deaths
19th-century Austrian military personnel
18th-century Austrian military personnel